José Inagaki (born 16 December 1965) is a Peruvian wrestler. He competed in the men's freestyle 62 kg at the 1984 Summer Olympics.

References

External links
 

1965 births
Living people
Peruvian male sport wrestlers
Olympic wrestlers of Peru
Wrestlers at the 1984 Summer Olympics
Place of birth missing (living people)
Sambokas at the 1983 Pan American Games
Wrestlers at the 1983 Pan American Games
Medalists at the 1983 Pan American Games
Pan American Games silver medalists for Peru
Pan American Games medalists in wrestling
20th-century Peruvian people
21st-century Peruvian people